Almont is a city in Morton County, North Dakota, United States. It is part of the "Bismarck, ND Metropolitan Statistical Area" or "Bismarck–Mandan". The population was 100 at the 2020 census. Almont was founded in 1906, incorporated in 1936, and reached a peak population of 232 in 1940. The Northern Pacific Railroad tracks were removed in 1947 when the mainline was rerouted, and the city has since withered to just above 100 residents.

Geography

Climate
This climatic region is typified by large seasonal temperature differences, with warm to hot (and often humid) summers and cold (sometimes severely cold) winters.  According to the Köppen Climate Classification system, Almont has a humid continental climate, abbreviated "Dfb" on climate maps.

The Köppen Climate Classification subtype for this climate is "Dfb" (Humid Continental Climate).

Demographics

2010 census
As of the census of 2010, there were 122 people, 51 households, and 30 families living in the city. The racial makeup of the city was 100.0% White.

There were 51 households, of which 29.4% had children under the age of 18 living with them, 52.9% were married couples living together, 3.9% had a female householder with no husband present, 2.0% had a male householder with no wife present, and 41.2% were non-families. 37.3% of all households were made up of individuals, and 27.4% had someone living alone who was 65 years of age or older. The average household size was 2.39 and the average family size was 3.23.

The median age in the city was 41.8 years. 27.9% of residents were under the age of 18; 6.5% were between the ages of 18 and 24; 18.8% were from 25 to 44; 32.8% were from 45 to 64; and 13.9% were 65 years of age or older. The gender makeup of the city was 49.2% male and 50.8% female.

2000 census
As of the census of 2000, there were 89 people, 43 households, and 22 families living in the city. The population density was 33.8 people per square mile (13.1/km2). There were 63 housing units at an average density of 23.9 per square mile (9.2/km2). The racial makeup of the city was 100.0% White.

There were 43 households, out of which 25.6% had children under the age of 18 living with them, 44.2% were married couples living together, 4.7% had a female householder with no husband present, and 48.8% were non-families. 44.2% of all households were made up of individuals, and 23.3% had someone living alone who was 65 years of age or older. The average household size was 2.07 and the average family size was 3.00.

In the city, the population was spread out, with 24.7% under the age of 18, 5.6% from 18 to 24, 28.1% from 25 to 44, 23.6% from 45 to 64, and 18.0% who were 65 years of age or older. The median age was 40 years. For every 100 females, there were 81.6 males. For every 100 females age 18 and over, there were 86.1 males.

The median income for a household in the city was $25,625, and the median income for a family was $30,625. Males had a median income of $24,375 versus $15,000 for females. The per capita income for the city was $13,761. There were no families and 6.4% of the population living below the poverty line, including no under eighteens and 38.9% of those over 64.

Education
It is in the New Salem-Almont School District.

Almont was previously in Sims School District 8, which operated Almont Elementary School. At the time the district sent high school students to New Salem schools. The district merged with New Salem schools in 2008. In Fall 2008 the North Dakota Department of Public Instruction listed Almont Elementary as being "nonoperating".

References

External links
50th anniversary history book : Almont, North Dakota, 1906-1956 from the Digital Horizons website

Cities in North Dakota
Cities in Morton County, North Dakota
Populated places established in 1906
1906 establishments in North Dakota